José Luandino Vieira (born José Vieira Mateus da Graça on 4 May 1935) is an Angolan writer of short fiction and novels.

Biography
Vieira was born in Lagoa de Furadouro, Ourém, Portugal to impoverished parents—his father was a cobbler, his mother a homemaker from a peasant background—who immigrated to Angola in 1938. He grew up immersed in the African quarters (musseques) of Luanda. He wrote in the language unique to the musseque, a fusion of Kimbundu and Portuguese. Vieira left school at the age of fifteen and worked as a mechanic.  He became a literary protegé of the older poet António Jacinto  and a collaborator of António Cardoso, another working-class white Angolan writer of his generation.''Vieira is best known for his work in the form of the long short story influenced  by African oral narrative.  His stories, which he calls estórias,  deal with the harsh realities of Portuguese rule in Angola. His best-known work was his early short story collection, Luuanda (1963), which received a Portuguese writers' literary award in 1965, though it was banned by the Portuguese government until 1972 due to its examination of the oppressiveness of the colonial administration in Angola. His novella A vida verdadeira de Domingos Xavier (The Real Life of Domingos Xavier) portrayed both the cruelty of the Portuguese administration and the courage of ordinary Angolans during the colonial period.  The French-Caribbean director Sarah Maldoror filmed this novel under the title Sambizanga. Other works include Velhas estórias ("Old Stories"; 1974), Nós os do Makulusu ("Our Gang from Makulusu"; 1974), Vidas novas ("New Lives"; 1975), and João Vêncio: os seus amores ("The Loves of João Vêncio"; 1979).

Vieira was jailed briefly in 1959 for pro-independence activism. In 1961, while travelling through Portugal with his wife and four-month-old son to a training course in London organized by his employer, the American company EIMCO, Vieira was arrested and transported to Luanda, where he was imprisoned in the São Paulo prison until 1964.<ref>José Luandino Vieira, Papéis da prisão. Apontamentos. Diário.Correspondência (1962-1971), pp. 1021-1022</ref> In 1964, Vieira, Jacinto and Cardoso were transferred by ship to the concentration camp in Tarrafal, Cabo Verde.  Vieira wrote almost all of his fiction in Tarrafal, beginning to publish it—not necessarily in the order in which it was written.--having smuggled his manuscripts out of the camp, after the 25 April 1974 military coup in Portugal.

In 1972 Vieira and António Jacinto were released from Tarrafal as part of an attempt on the part of the regime of Marcello Caetano to improve its international image.  They were ordered to live in Lisbon under police surveillance. In late 1972 Vieira's controversial short story collection Luuanda was published again in Portugal, but was soon banned for a second time. After the fall of the dictatorship in 1974, Vieira remained in Lisbon, overseeing the publication of his manuscripts, until the end of the year. In January 1975 he returned to Angola.  Between 1975 and 1992, Vieira held important posts in the cultural bureaucracy of independent Angola, notably as Secretary-General of the Union of Angolan Writers.  During this time, he stopped writing, but helped many younger Angolan writers to publish.  In 1992, he left Angola and has since lived a reclusive life in rural Portugal.

Vieira turned down the 100,000 Euros Camões Literary Prize awarded to him in May 2006, citing personal reasons.

Works
A CIdade e a Infância.  Written in the late 1950s. Published in Luanda in 1957, in a limited edition which was confiscated by the police. Republished in Portugal 1960.
 A vida verdadeira de Domingos Xavier. Written 1961. Circulated in clandestine editions and a French translation by Mário Pinto de Andrade. Published in Portugal 1974.  English Trans. by Michael Wolfers as The Real Life of Domingos Xavier, Heinemann, African Writers Series no. 202, 1978.
Nosso Musseque. Written 1962. Published in Portugal 2003. English Trans. by Robin Patterson, Our Musseque, Dedalus Press, 2015.
Vidas Novas. Written 1962. Published in Portugal 1974.
 Luuanda, Written 1963. Published 1964. English trans. by Tamara L. Bender Heinemann, African Writers Series no. 222, 1980.
 Velhas estórias. Written 1964-65.  Published 1974.
 Nós os do Makulusu Written 1967. Published 1974
 João Vêncio: os seus amores. Written 1968. Published 1979. English Trans. by Richard Zenith, The Loves of João Vêncio,  Harcourt, Brace, Johanovich, 1991.
 No Antigamente, Na Vida.  Written 1969. Published 1974.
 Macandumba.  Written 1970-71. Published 1978.
 Lourentinho, Dona Antónia de Sousa Neto e eu. Written 1972. Published 1981.
 O livro dos rios. 2006
 Papéis da prisão. Apontamentos, Diário, Correspondência (1962-1971), 2015.

References

External links
 Luandino Vieira biography.
 Luandino Vieira in Encyclopædia Britannica

Angolan writers
Angolan people of Portuguese descent
1935 births
Living people
Portuguese emigrants to Angola
Camões Prize winners
People from Ourém
20th-century male writers